Williams Lake is a 155-acre all-sports lake in Waterford Township in Oakland County, Michigan in the Clinton River watershed.

The lake lies north of the Oakland County International Airport, to the west of Airport Road, and to the south and east of Williams Lake Road.

Williams Lake connects upstream to Maceday Lake.

Namesake

Williams Lake was named for Ferdinand Williams, who, in 1829, was the first to settle on Williams Lake. Ferdinand was the son of John R. Williams, the first mayor of Detroit, Michigan.

Fish
Fish in Williams Lake include bluegill, largemouth bass, perch, northern pike and crappie.

References

Lakes of Oakland County, Michigan
Lakes of Michigan
Lakes of Waterford Township, Michigan